Merchants and Farmers National Bank Building was a historic bank building in Charlotte, Mecklenburg County, North Carolina. It was built in 1871–1872, a three-story, brick building with a stuccoed front and Italianate style cast iron trim manufactured by the Mecklenburg Iron Works. The building housed Independent Order of Odd Fellows lodges that met there from the 1870s through 1920. It was the oldest surviving commercial building in the central business district of Charlotte until it was demolished in 1989.

It was added to the National Register of Historic Places in 1984. The building was demolished in 1989 to make room for construction of the new corporate headquarter of NCNB, which later became Bank of America.
Currently, the Bank of America Corporate Center sits at the former location of the building.

References

Bank buildings on the National Register of Historic Places in North Carolina
Italianate architecture in North Carolina
Commercial buildings completed in 1872
Buildings and structures in Charlotte, North Carolina
National Register of Historic Places in Mecklenburg County, North Carolina
Demolished buildings and structures in North Carolina
Buildings and structures demolished in 1989